Groovy Girls were a line of fashion dolls manufactured by the American toy company Manhattan Toy and launched in 1998. Each year new dolls were produced until 2019.

History
Groovy Girls launched in 1998 as a funky alternative to Barbie. Each doll had different skin tones, hair types and facial features, reflecting the ethnic landscape of the world.

The brand's lifestyle aspects were fashion, friendship and self-expression and represents a wholesome alternative to dolls such as Bratz, Flavas, My Scene, and Barbies.
Groovy Girls were initially sold in specialty toy stores such as Zany Brainy and Noodle Kidoodle. Beginning in early 2005, the dolls were launched in Target stores.

Following the economic crisis of 2008, they were pulled from Target's shelves and begun to only be sold at specialty stores and online from then on out.
As of 2005, more than eight million Groovy Girls dolls were sold since its inception.
As of 2020, Groovy Girls continue to be sold but no new models are being produced.

List of Groovy Girls
Here is a list of basic Groovy Girls by their year of release.

Some characters share names. Not counting the updated looks of the Main 6, there have been 2 dolls named Trini, 2 dolls named Vanessa, 2 dolls named Carissa, and 3 dolls named Marissa.

1998
 Lexi
 Liza
 Lupe
 Lucy

1999
 Michaela
 Max (male)
 Zane (male)
 Ziggy (male)
 Zarah
 Zoe

2000

 Gabi
 Gwenn (not to be confused with Gwen of the Main 6)
 Jacinda
 Jada
 Josie
 Janisse
 Jordan
 Jayna
 Jackson (male)
 Jarrett (male)

2001

 Sarita
 Solana
 Sesilia
 Siri
 Shika
 Sidra
 Samuel (male)
 Sean (male)
 Kinzey
 Karly
 Kayla
 Kami
 Kendra 
 Kelsey

2002

 Talli
 Tomiko
 Trini 
 Vanessa (light skinned)
 Verity
 Victoria
 Kalvin (male)
 Kyle (male)

2003
 Carissa
 Cicely
 Celeste
 Bindi
 Brenna
 Britta
 Darci 
 Danika
 Daphne
 Brandon (male)
 Blake (male)
 Britney

2004
 Ailene
 Angelique
 Ayanna
 Hope 
Main 6:
 Gwen
 Reese
 Oki
 O'Ryan
 Vanessa (dark skinned)
 Yvette

2005
 Kassi
 Kylee
 Kenna
 Larissa
 Leticia 
 Lourdes
 Kieran (male)

2006
 Ellie Mae (cowgirl)
 Roxanna (rock star)
Main 6 Updated:
 Gwen (2nd in a series)
 Reese (2nd in a series)
 Oki (2nd in a series)
 O'Ryan (2nd in a series)
 Vanessa (2nd in a series, dark skinned)
 Yvette (2nd in a series)

2007
 Rayannah
 Raelyn
 Roxette
 Raina (punk)
 Ruby Mae
 Petula
 Pilar
 Phoebe

2008
 Zadie 
 Zanita
 Zelma
 Fenia
 Fleur
 Franci

2009
 Corbin
 Chelsi
 Camilla 
 Connor (male)
 Cadence

2010
 Tegan
 Tamae
 Thora
 Tessa
 Tamsen

2011
 Izzie
 Isadora
 Iku
 Irina
 Inga
 Inez
 Nadia
 Nina
 Nora

2012
 Amelia
 Gabriella
 Katrina
 Seanna
 Sage
 Suki

2013
 Marissa
 Myla 
 Maren

2014
 Brooklyn
 Bayani
 Breanna
 Bailey
 Skylar
 Fuchsia
 Lilia
 Jasmine

2015
 Renee
 Robyn
 Rachel
 Reagan

2016
Lola
Lily
Layla
Logan

2017

Super Groovy Girl
Velvet
Jessica
Rose
Katy
Meghan
Janelle
Lorelei
Justin

2018

Sunshine
Kat
Jamie
Princess Abi
Princess Crystelle

2019

Willow
Birdie
Primrose
April

Poseable
These had wires in their arms and legs that made them able to strike different poses. They were released from 2006 to 2008.

 Andie (Go-Go Girl, 2007)
 Aleika (Breakdancer, 2007)
 Analise (Yoga, 2007)
 Adrianna (Salsa, 2007)
 Ayumi (Roller Skating, 2007)
 Anya (Ballerina, 2007)
 Trini (also released as a non-poseable, 2006)
 Taryn (also released as a non-poseable, 2006)
 Trissa (also released as a non-poseable, 2006)
 Shayla (also released as a non-poseable, 2006)
 Savanna (also released as a non-poseable, 2006)
 Brylee (Karate, 2008)
 Brandice (2008)
 Bella-Mae (Cowgirl, 2008)
 Selia (also released as a non-poseable, 2006)
 Bastian (male, 2008)
 Dylan (male, 2006)

Holiday Exclusives
Christmas
 Anastasia Sparkle (2008)
 Cali Candy Cane (2011)
 Chrissy Christmas (2005)
 Christa Christmas (2010)
 Garnet Glitterbella (2008)
 Holiday Hannah (2010)
 Holiday Wishes Hadley (2013)
 Molly Mistletoe (2012)
 Noella (2004)
 Snowflake Sophie (2009)
 Deck the Halls Dessa (2013)
 Sylvie Starr (2007)
 Tessa Tannenbaum (2006)
 Tyanna Tannenbaum (2006)
 Merry Marissa (2014)
 Noelle (2015)
 Christmas Belle (2016)
 Jingle Belle (2017)

Easter
 Petal (2005)
 Clara (2006)
 Elisa (2014)

Valentine's Day
 Vivica (2006)
 Valana (2005)
 Viviana (2014)

Halloween
 Ember (2006)
 Cinder-Sue (2007)
 Countessa (2005)
 Willow Witch (2004)
 Charissa Cat (2008)
 Candy Corn Carissa (2009)

RSVP
These dolls came with codes to unlock special items online. They celebrated Groovy Girls' 10th anniversary. The RSVP line dates from 2008 to 2009.

 Amara 
 Alesa
 Amalina
 Latasha
 Libbi and Louie (Louie is a dog attached to Libbi's hand.)
 Lakinzie
 Lycia
 Linae
 Dela
 Denell
 Dhara
 Darise

Fun Packs
 Kali and Krista (Fashion Blizzard) October 2002
 Kassidy (Belle Espirit) March 2002
 Lailie (Birthday Girlie) 2006
 Evie (Saddle Up) 2006
 Sarina (Soccer) 2006
 Sawyer (Surfer, male) 2006
 Becca (Basketball) 2006
 Sasha (Posh Party) Late 2001
 Bindi (Vet En Vogue) 2007
 Yvette and Carissa (Sleepover Central) 2007
 Brida (Ballet) 2007
 Josh (Attitude on Wheels, male) 2006
 Charisse (Ready to Rock) 2006
 Helena (Groovy Games Swim Team) 2004
 Hadlee (Groovy Games Gymnast) 2004
 Harper (Groovy Games Soccer) 2004
 Winter Rose (Snowy Sensation) 2008
 Shauna (Spa Splendor) 2006
 Reva (Sticker Snazzmatazz) 2003
 Rochelle (Sticker Snazzmatazz) 2003
 Shatrina (Midnight Madness) 2007
 Aria (Gimme a G!) 2007

Troop Groovy Girls
These dolls were partnered up with Girl Scouts. The Troop line dates from 2007 to 2010.

 Respectful Roxi (2007)
 Friendly Fiona (2007)
 Caring Caitlin (2007)
 Courageous Camara (2007)
 Fair Faye (2009)
 Considerate Christa (2008)
 Helpful Haylee (2009)
 Strong Sierra (2008)
 Responsible Rilee (2009)
 Honest Hala (2007)
 Dinah (Daisy Girl Scout, 2010)
 Kiri (poseable, 2008)
 Ardella (poseable, 2008)

Dreamtastic
The Dreamtastic line dates from 2005 to 2011.
 Melina Mermaid (2006)
 Bride Jennibelle (2007)
 Bridesmaid Melinda (2007)
 Princess Seraphina (2006, 2010)
 Princess Sharissa (2006)
 Prince Lance (2005)
 Princess Lucinda (2005)
 Flower Girl Faith (2007)
 Jennica and Gavin's Wedding (2007)
 Binni Ballerina (2006)
 Franchesca Fairy (2006)
 Bellissima Ballerina (2008)

Candy Kingdom
The Candy Kingdom doll line dates from 2007. Fatina and Dari have their pets on leashes attached to their hands.
 Dari and Dottilicious Puppy
 Fatina and Fluffy Cotton Candy Kitty
 Princess Bubblegum Bella
 Princess Candy Heart Cassidy
 Princess Lollipop Lola

Special Edition
These dolls date from 2005 to 2012.
 Rock Around The Clock Bobby and Suzy Q (2006)
 Safari Kari (2005)
 Fleurabella (2010)
 Chef Charlotte (2010)
 Irish Steppin' Adelaene (2010)
 Starletta (2008)
 Galexia (2011)
 Bianca Ballerina (2011)
 Birthday Wishes Betsy (2012)
 Fayla Fairy (2012)
 Steffi 
 Lexa (Learning Express exclusive)
 Lexanne (Learning Express exclusive)
 Lynne (Ron Jon Surf Shop exclusive, 2005)

Chic Boutique
The Chic Boutique doll line dates from 2005.
 Nicole
 Natalya
 Nanette

Flutterflies
The Flutterflies doll line dates from 2010.
 Lana Ladybug
 Becca Butterfly
 Dani Dragonfly

Princesses
The princesses date from 2010 to 2015.
 Princess Leilani
 Princess Peony
 Princess Isabella
 Princess Ariana
 Princess Liliana
 Princess Dazzelina
 Princess Ella
 Princess Dahlia
 Princess Crystelle
 Princess Abi
 Princess Camellia

Mermaids
The mermaids date from 2002 to 2012.
 Marissa
 Myra
 Maya
 Macy
 Maddie
 McKenna
 Aqualina

Style Scents
These dolls date from 2015, and each one is fruity-scented. They all come with a pet as well.
 Mia - comes with pet dog Taffy and smells like watermelon
 Lilly - comes with pet cat Parfait and smells like raspberry
 Sadie - comes with pet rabbit Shortcake and smells like strawberry

Fairybelles
The fairies date from 2015.
 Nissa
 Cricket
 Breena

Groovy Girls Sleepover Club
Groovy Girls Sleepover Club was a series of short, chapter books for early readers starring the main 6 Groovy Girls, who were Gwen, Reese, O'Ryan, Oki, Vanessa, and Yvette. The books each contained 80 pages and a few illustrations. The books were published from 2005 to 2006.

List of books
 The First Pajama Party: Slumberiffic Six
 Pranks a Lot: The Girls vs. The Boys
 Sleepover Surprise: A Twin-Sational Birthday
 Rock and Roll: Divas Supreme
 Choose or Lose: How to Pick a Winner
 The Great Outdoors: Take a Hike
 Growing up Groovy: An Out-of-this-World Adventure
 Girls of Summer: Bon Voyage

Licensing and awards
Burger King offered miniaturized plastic as well as plush versions of Groovy Girls in its global Kids Meal program, which ran from February 12, 2007 to March 18, 2007. 
That year, Manhattan Toy also partnered with the Girl Scouts to develop a line extension of dolls called Troop Groovy Girls. 
An online community called Camp Groovy Girls launched in September, soon after the dolls became available in stores. In February 2008, the Toy Industry Association named the Girl Scouts' Troop Groovy Girls the best girl toy of the year during the American International Toy Fair in New York City. Groovy Girls had previously won "Girl Toy of the Year" and "Specialty Toy of the Year" awards at the 2003 Toy Fair.

References

Doll brands
Fashion dolls
Products introduced in 1998
1990s toys
2000s toys
2010s toys
Stuffed toys